Cape Charlotte (located at ) is a cape that forms the southeast side of the entrance to Royal Bay on the north coast near the eastern end of South Georgia in the Atlantic Ocean. It was discovered in 1775 by a British expedition under Captain James Cook, who named it for Queen Charlotte, wife of King George III of the United Kingdom.

References
 

Headlands of South Georgia